Sarnath Jain Tirth, also called the Shreyanshnath Jain Temple, is a Jain temple in Sarnath. It is located roughly 50 meters to the southeast of Dhamek Stupa.

History
Simhapuri, present-day Singhpuri village, is believed to be the birthplace of the Shreyansanatha, the 11th tirthankara. The place also marks four of five Kalyanaka (auspicious events) of Shreyansanatha: Chyavan (tirthankara enter's their mother's womb), Janm (birth), Diksha (renunciation) and Kevala Jnana (omniscience). Mahavira also delivered sermons at Sarnath and Varanasi. The ruins near the main temple are believed to be of an ancient Jain temple erected by Śvētāmbara.

About temple
The temple was constructed in 1824 CE to commemorate the birthplace of Shreyansanatha. The mulnayak(primary deity) of the temple is a large image of Shreyansanatha and impressions of footprints. The temple also features attractive frescoes depicting the life of Mahavira.

Gallery

See also
 Parshvanath Jain temple, Varanasi

References

Citations

Sources

External links
 

Jain temples in Uttar Pradesh
19th-century Jain temples